The 97th meridian west of Greenwich is a line of longitude that extends from the North Pole across the Arctic Ocean, North America, the Gulf of Mexico, the Pacific Ocean, the Southern Ocean, and Antarctica to the South Pole.

The 97th meridian west forms a great circle with the 83rd meridian east.

From Pole to Pole
Starting at the North Pole and heading south to the South Pole, the 97th meridian west passes through:

{| class="wikitable plainrowheaders"
! scope="col" width="120" | Co-ordinates
! scope="col" | Country, territory or sea
! scope="col" | Notes
|-valign="top"
| style="background:#b0e0e6;" | 
! scope="row" style="background:#b0e0e6;" | Arctic Ocean
| style="background:#b0e0e6;" | Passing just west of Axel Heiberg Island, Nunavut,  (at ) Passing just east of the Fay Islands, Nunavut,  (at )
|-
| 
! scope="row" | 
| Nunavut — Amund Ringnes Island
|-valign="top"
| style="background:#b0e0e6;" | 
! scope="row" style="background:#b0e0e6;" | Unnamed waterbody
| style="background:#b0e0e6;" | Passing just east of Crescent Island, Nunavut,  (at )
|-
| 
! scope="row" | 
| Nunavut — Pioneer Island
|-valign="top"
| style="background:#b0e0e6;" | 
! scope="row" style="background:#b0e0e6;" | Penny Strait
| style="background:#b0e0e6;" | Passing just east of Spit Island, Nunavut,  (at ) Passing just west of Devon Island, Nunavut,  (at ) Passing just east of John Barrow Island, Nunavut,  (at ) Passing just east of Hyde Parker Island, Nunavut,  (at )
|-valign="top"
| style="background:#b0e0e6;" | 
! scope="row" style="background:#b0e0e6;" | Queens Channel
| style="background:#b0e0e6;" | Passing just west of Des Voeux Island, Nunavut,  (at ) Passing just west of Milne Island, Nunavut,  (at )
|-
| 
! scope="row" | 
| Nunavut — Little Cornwallis Island
|-valign="top"
| style="background:#b0e0e6;" | 
! scope="row" style="background:#b0e0e6;" | McDougall Sound
| style="background:#b0e0e6;" | Passing just east of Truro Island, Nunavut,  (at )
|-
| style="background:#b0e0e6;" | 
! scope="row" style="background:#b0e0e6;" | Parry Channel
| style="background:#b0e0e6;" |
|-
| 
! scope="row" | 
| Nunavut — Prince of Wales Island
|-
| style="background:#b0e0e6;" | 
! scope="row" style="background:#b0e0e6;" | Peel Sound
| style="background:#b0e0e6;" |
|-
| 
! scope="row" | 
| Nunavut — Vivian Island and Prescott Island
|-
| style="background:#b0e0e6;" | 
! scope="row" style="background:#b0e0e6;" | Browne Bay
| style="background:#b0e0e6;" | Passing just west of Pandora Island, Nunavut,  (at )
|-
| style="background:#b0e0e6;" | 
! scope="row" style="background:#b0e0e6;" | Young Bay
| style="background:#b0e0e6;" |
|-
| 
! scope="row" | 
| Nunavut — Prince of Wales Island and Hobday Island
|-
| style="background:#b0e0e6;" | 
! scope="row" style="background:#b0e0e6;" | Franklin Strait
| style="background:#b0e0e6;" |
|-
| style="background:#b0e0e6;" | 
! scope="row" style="background:#b0e0e6;" | Larsen Sound
| style="background:#b0e0e6;" |
|-valign="top"
| style="background:#b0e0e6;" | 
! scope="row" style="background:#b0e0e6;" | James Ross Strait
| style="background:#b0e0e6;" | Passing just east of the Clarence Islands, Nunavut,  (at )
|-
| 
! scope="row" | 
| Nunavut — King William Island
|-
| style="background:#b0e0e6;" | 
! scope="row" style="background:#b0e0e6;" | Simpson Strait
| style="background:#b0e0e6;" |
|-valign="top"
| 
! scope="row" | 
Also passing just east of the city of Winnipeg
|-valign="top"
| 
! scope="row" | 
|-
| style="background:#b0e0e6;" | 
! scope="row" style="background:#b0e0e6;" | Gulf of Mexico
| style="background:#b0e0e6;" |
|-valign="top"
| 
! scope="row" | 
| Veracruz Puebla — for about 6 km from  Veracruz — from  Puebla — from  Oaxaca — from 
|-
| style="background:#b0e0e6;" | 
! scope="row" style="background:#b0e0e6;" | Pacific Ocean
| style="background:#b0e0e6;" |
|-
| style="background:#b0e0e6;" | 
! scope="row" style="background:#b0e0e6;" | Southern Ocean
| style="background:#b0e0e6;" |
|-
| 
! scope="row" | Antarctica
| Unclaimed territory
|-
|}

See also
96th meridian west
98th meridian west

w097 meridian west